The 2009–10 Drexel Dragons men's basketball team represented Drexel University during the 2009–10 NCAA Division I men's basketball season. The Dragons, led by 9th year head coach Bruiser Flint, played their home games at the Daskalakis Athletic Center and were members of the Colonial Athletic Association.

Roster

Schedule

|-
!colspan=8 style="background:#F8B800; color:#002663;"| Regular season
|-

|-
!colspan=8 style="background:#F8B800; color:#002663;"| CAA tournament

Awards
Chris Fouch
CAA Rookie of the Year
CAA All-Rookie Team
CAA Player of the Week
CAA Rookie of the Week (3)

Samme Givens
CAA Player of the Week

Jamie Harris
CAA All-Conference Third Team
CAA Player of the Week

Derrick Thomas
CAA Rookie of the Week

References

Drexel Dragons men's basketball seasons
Drexel
Drexel
Drexel